The 2021 Philippine Basketball Association (PBA) Philippine Cup Finals was a best-of-7 championship series of the 2021 PBA Philippine Cup, and the conclusion of the conference's playoffs. The TNT Tropang Giga and the Magnolia Hotshots competed for the 43rd Philippine Cup championship and the 129th overall championship contested by the league.

This was the first time that the two teams meet in the finals since the 2014 Commissioner's Cup, where Magnolia (named as San Mig Super Coffee Mixers during that time) won the championship against TNT (named as Talk 'N Text Tropang Texters during that time), three games to one.

TNT defeated Magnolia, four games to one, to win the franchise's sixth Philippine Cup (8 years after their last Philippine Cup championship in 2013) and their 8th title overall. This was the first PBA title by a franchise not owned by the San Miguel Corporation since the 2016 PBA Commissioner's Cup. Mikey Williams was named the Finals' MVP.

Background

Road to the finals

Head-to-head matchup

Series summary

Game summaries

Game 1

Game 2

Game 3

Game 4

Prior to the game, Magnolia's Calvin Abueva was awarded his second Best Player of the Conference award, beating TNT's Mikey Williams and Abueva's teammate, Ian Sangalang, to the award.

Game 5

Rosters

{| class="toccolours" style="font-size: 95%; width: 100%;"
|-
! colspan="2" style="background-color: #000000; color: #FDD501; text-align: center;" | TNT Tropang Giga 2021 PBA Philippine Cup roster
|- style="background-color:#0055AF; color: #FFFFFF; text-align: center;"
! Players !! Coaches
|-
| valign="top" |
{| class="sortable" style="background:transparent; margin:0px; width:100%;"
! Pos. !! # !! POB !! Name !! Height !! Weight !! !! College 
|-

{| class="toccolours" style="font-size: 95%; width: 100%;"
|-
! colspan="2" style="background-color: #; color: #; text-align: center;" | Magnolia Hotshots 2021 PBA Philippine Cup roster
|- style="background-color:#; color: #; text-align: center;"
! Players !! Coaches
|-
| valign="top" |
{| class="sortable" style="background:transparent; margin:0px; width:100%;"
! Pos. !! # !! POB !! Name !! Height !! Weight !! !! College 
|-

Broadcast notes
The Philippine Cup Finals was aired on TV5 with simulcasts on One Sports and PBA Rush (both in standard and high definition). TV5's radio arm, Radyo5 provided the radio play-by-play coverage. 

One Sports provided online livestreaming via the PusoPilipinas and Smart Sports Facebook pages using the TV5 and PBA Rush feeds respectively.

The PBA Rush broadcast provided English-language coverage of the Finals.

Due to COVID-19 restrictions, the TV and radio panel commentaries except for the courtside reporter were conducted offsite from the TV5 Media Center in Mandaluyong.

Additional Game 5 crew: 
Trophy presentation: Carlo Pamintuan
Celebration interviewers: Carlo Pamintuan

References

External links
PBA official website

2021
2021 PBA season
PBA Philippine Cup Finals
Magnolia Hotshots games
TNT Tropang Giga games